Yagodovo may refer to:

 Yagodovo, Montana Province - a village in Berkovitsa municipality, Montana Province, Bulgaria
 Yagodovo, Plovdiv Province - a village in Rodopi municipality, Plovdiv Province, Bulgaria